Adel Guemari (born 16 February 1984 in Marseille) is a French-Algerian former professional footballer who played as a defender.

External links
 
 
 

1984 births
Living people
Footballers from Marseille
Association football defenders
French sportspeople of Algerian descent
French footballers
Algerian footballers
SC Bastia players
Holstein Kiel players
Ligue 1 players
Expatriate footballers in Algeria
French expatriate sportspeople in Algeria
Algerian expatriates in Germany
Entente SSG players
FC Oberneuland players
USM Annaba players